Richmond Barracks was a military installation in Richmond, North Yorkshire.

History
The barracks were built as the depot of the two battalions of the 19th (The 1st Yorkshire North Riding - Princess of Wales's Own) Regiment of Foot between 1875 and 1877. Their creation took place as part of the Cardwell Reforms which encouraged the localisation of British military forces. Following the Childers Reforms, the 19th Regiment of Foot evolved to become the Green Howards with its depot at the barracks in 1881.

The barracks were demoted to the status of out-station to the Yorkshire Brigade depot at Queen Elizabeth Barracks in 1958 and at the same time renamed Alma Barracks after the Battle of Alma, in which conflict the Regiment took part during the Crimean War. The main part of the barracks closed in 1961 and the Regimental Headquarters and the Green Howards Museum moved to Holy Trinity Church in Richmond Market Place in 1973. The main site was converted for use as an approved school and, since 1985, as a housing development known as Garden Village.

References

Installations of the British Army
Barracks in England